The Crown Fire was a wildfire that scorched  of land in Los Angeles County, California. The second largest fire of the 2010 California wildfire season, the fire also destroyed 10 residences.

As the fire advanced on July 30, it jumped the California Aqueduct and progressed towards homes in Palmdale.

The cause of the blaze was ultimately traced to a lot in Agua Dulce where workers were using a hammer to extract bolts from a tire rim and created sparks.

References 

2010 California wildfires
Wildfires in Los Angeles County, California